Darby Berkhout (born 20 May 1966) is a Canadian rower. He competed in the men's coxless four event at the 1988 Summer Olympics.

References

External links
 

1966 births
Living people
Canadian male rowers
Olympic rowers of Canada
Rowers at the 1988 Summer Olympics
People from Port Colborne
Pan American Games medalists in rowing
Pan American Games silver medalists for Canada
Pan American Games bronze medalists for Canada
Rowers at the 1987 Pan American Games